The RN-6 National Highway is a national highway in southwestern Djibouti. It passes through the town of As Eyla and ends at the village of Kouta Bouyya 

Roads in Djibouti